B1 TV is a Romanian television network which began broadcasting in 2001 as a general-profile channel and became a news channel in 2011. B1 TV broadcasts 24 hours a day, seven days a week all over the country.

Overview 

B1 TV's main purpose is to inform its viewers about the overall context of the Romanian society through quality informative programs. B1 TV also covers the most important events that are happening every day in the world.

B1 TV's target audience consists of active highly educated and financially stable individuals, who mainly live in the city, are concerned about what is happening around them and are looking for quality products.

B1 TV is now broadcast via satellite through all analog and digital cable networks and has a 92% geographical covering.

History 

B1 TV first broadcast in December 2001, as a local general-profile station in Bucharest, Romania. In 2004, News Corporation purchased 12.5% of the network's shares.

In 2010, SC B1 TV Channel SRL purchased the audiovisual license for all programs under the name “B1”.

B1 TV's rebranding took place in March 2011 and became an infotainment TV channel. Two months later, in May, The National Audiovisual Council (CNA) extended B1 TV's broadcast license up to nine years. In September 2011, B1 TV officially became a news television station and has been broadcasting as such ever since.

Since the fall of 2011, B1 TV has broadcast in a “news and current affairs” format that involves a significant number of news programs and debates.

Logos

External links
 Official website

Television stations in Romania
Television channels and stations established in 2001
24-hour television news channels in Romania